Initial Rock, also known as Name Rock, in the Medora Ranger District of the Little Missouri National Grassland, near Medora, North Dakota, was listed on the National Register of Historic Places (NRHP) in 1976. It was the site of an overnight camp on May 28, 1876 of George Armstrong Custer's men, on their way to the Battle of Little Big Horn, which happened on June 25, 1876.

Two soldiers, W.C. Williams and F. Neely, carved their names in a rock still present at the site.  Williams and Neely, under the command of Marcus Reno, survived the battle.

A shelter over the rock has prevented further weathering and vandalism since 1966.

It is one of five sites that are included in Custer Military Trail Historic Archaeological District, which is a large historic district that was listed on the NRHP in 2009.  These sites are documented as part of a driving tour through the region.

References

Geography of Billings County, North Dakota
Inscribed rocks
Archaeological sites on the National Register of Historic Places in North Dakota
National Register of Historic Places in Billings County, North Dakota
Historic district contributing properties in North Dakota
Great Sioux War of 1876
Individual rocks
Individually listed contributing properties to historic districts on the National Register in North Dakota